The Northern Reaches is an accessory for the Dungeons & Dragons fantasy role-playing game.  The book describes the land known as the Northern Reaches, which lie on the eastern seaboard of the D&D game's Known World, also known as Mystara.

Contents
The Northern Reaches features guides Helfdan Halftroll, Onund Tolundmire, Saru the Serpent, and Dwalinn the Dwarf who provide a tour of the land known as the Northern Reaches. The accessory details the Viking-style lands of Ostland, Vestland, and Soderfjord. The thirty-two page Players Book provides a description the lands of the Northern Reaches, and rules for characters from this region, while the sixty-four page DM Book contains the history of the lands and their nations, and provides three adventure scenarios, an epic campaign outline, and a system rune magic for clerics.

The gazetteer also includes a large color map and cardstock cutouts for constructing scale model Viking buildings. The complete 3-D card village once assembled is intended to be used as the setting for two of the adventures in the set.

Publication history
GAZ7 The Northern Reaches was written by Ken Rolston and Elizabeth Danforth, with a cover by Clyde Caldwell and interior illustrations by Stephen Fabian, and was published by TSR in 1988 as a sixty-four page book, a thirty-two page book, four cardstock sheets, a large color map, and an outer folder.

Reception
Jim Bambra reviewed The Northern Reaches for Dragon magazine No. 143 (March 1989). He said that the book "introduces these cultures in a highly entertaining and informative manner", concluding, "With its solid role-playing excitement and easy to digest background, this Gazetteer belongs in every D&D game collection."

Lawrence Schick, in his 1991 book Heroic Worlds, felt that the gazetteer gave "an excellent feel for what the Norsemen were really like".

References

Dungeons & Dragons Gazetteers
Mystara
Role-playing game supplements introduced in 1988